TC10 is a small (~21 kDa) signaling G protein (more specifically a GTPase), and is a member of the Rho family of GTPases.

Further reading: Rho family of GTPases

References

G proteins